Trần Văn Học (born 3 February 1987, in Vietnam) is a Vietnamese footballer who plays as a left back for Quảng Nam

Career

Trần started his career with SHB Đà Nẵng.

References

1987 births
Living people
Vietnamese footballers
Vietnam international footballers
People from Quảng Trị province
SHB Da Nang FC players
Haiphong FC players
Quang Nam FC players
V.League 1 players
Association football defenders